Cnemaspis lokugei, or Lokuge's day gecko, is a species of diurnal gecko endemic to island of Sri Lanka.

Etymology
The specific name lokugei is named in honor of Ajith Nethkelum Lokuge, who is a prominent ecologist, analogue forestry specialist and a senior member of Young Zoologist's Association (YZA) of Sri Lanka.

Taxonomy
The species belongs to the Cnemaspis kandiana clade and closely related to C. podihuna.

Ecology
The species was discovered from a granite cave bordering a stream, Haputale, Badulla District. Later several specimens were recorded from granite rock caves of Idalgashinna which received rainfall during the southwest monsoon.

Description
The holotype, an adult male, measures , while the two female paratypes measure  in snout–vent length. Dorsum heterogeneous with smooth and keeled large granular scales. Chin, gular, pectoral and abdominal scales are smooth. There are 15–17 belly scales across mid body. Nostrils are oval and dorsolaterally orientated. Body short and slender. Head large and depressed. Snout relatively long. Pupil round and iris yellow. Head, body and limbs are reddish-brown with a dorsal yellow spot with black outer edge on neck. A faded, yellow broken vertebral stripe runs from occiput to tail. Chin and gular scales are yellow with dark spots. Tail dark brown.

References

lokugei
Reptiles of Sri Lanka
Endemic fauna of Sri Lanka
Reptiles described in 2021